Copelatus rocchii is a species of diving beetle. It is part of the genus Copelatus in the subfamily Copelatinae of the family Dytiscidae. It was described by Bilardo in 1982.

References

rocchii
Beetles described in 1982